The Collegiate Network (CN) is a program that provides financial and technical assistance to student editors and writers of roughly 100 independent, conservative and libertarian publications at colleges and universities around the United States. Member publications have a combined annual distribution of more than two million. Since 1995, the CN has been administered by the Intercollegiate Studies Institute (ISI), a nonprofit educational organization that promotes conservative thought on college campuses, headquartered in Wilmington, Delaware.

Mission
According to its web site, CN supports college publications which "serve to focus public awareness on the politicization of American college and university classrooms, curricula, student life, and the resulting decline of educational standards." Newspapers and journals in the CN regularly call attention to what they interpret as corruption and hypocrisy in campus administrations' and student groups' policies, argue in favor of free speech in liberal education, encourage discussion and debate, and train students in the principles and practices of journalism.

History
In 1979, the Institute For Educational Affairs (IEA) responded to the request of two University of Chicago students for start-up funding for a new conservative newspaper, Counterpoint. By 1980, the grant program had been expanded and named the Collegiate Network, and by 1983, under the continuing administration of the IEA, had added both internships and persistent operating grants for conservative campus newspapers. In 1990, the Madison Center for Educational Affairs merged with the IEA to maintain funding for what had expanded to 57 conservative student publications. The Intercollegiate Studies Institute took over operations in 1995 and has since administered the CN from Wilmington, Delaware.

Member publications
CN member publications include:
 The Brown Spectator, Brown University
 Binghamton Review, Binghamton University
 California Patriot, University of California, Berkeley
 Carolina Review, University of North Carolina at Chapel Hill
 The Capitol Collegian, Florida State University
 The Centurion, Rutgers University
 The Clock Tower Courier, Saint Louis University
 The Conntrarian, Connecticut College
 The Cornell Review, Cornell University
 The Dartmouth Review, Dartmouth College
 The Harvard Ichthus, Harvard University
 The Harvard Salient, Harvard University
 The Kenyon Observer, Kenyon College
 The Michigan Review, University of Michigan
 The Minnesota Republic, University of Minnesota
 The UPenn Statesman, University of Pennsylvania
 The Prince Arthur Herald, McGill University
 Princeton Tory, Princeton University
 The Stanford Review, Stanford University
 Texas Review of Law and Politics, University of Texas at Austin
 The Villanova Times, Villanova University
 The Virginia Informer, College of William & Mary
 The Tower, Trinity University
 The Irish Rover, University of Notre Dame

References

External links
 
 Organizational Profile – National Center for Charitable Statistics (Urban Institute)

Charities based in Delaware
Academic publishing
Educational charities based in the United States
Libertarian organizations based in the United States
American journalism organizations
Organizations established in 1979
Conservative organizations in the United States